Davitashvili (Georgian: დავითაშვილი) is a Georgian surname that may refer to
Bagration-Davitashvili, Georgian noble family
Alexander Davitashvili (born 1974), Georgian judoka
Eugenia Davitashvili (1949–2015), Russian faith healer, writer and painter 
Koba Davitashvili (1971–2020), Georgian politician 
Zuriko Davitashvili (born 2001), Georgian football player

Georgian-language surnames
Patronymic surnames
Surnames from given names